Tifereth Israel ( "Glory/Splendor/Beauty of Israel") may refer to:

Synagogues

Canada
 Tiferet Israel Congregation, a Moroccan Jewish synagogue in North York, Toronto, Ontario, Canada

Israel
 Tiferet Yisrael Synagogue, one of the most outstanding synagogues in the Old City of Jerusalem in the 19th and 20th centuries, destroyed during the 1948 Arab-Israeli War and left in ruins. As of 2019, it is being rebuilt.

United States

California
Sephardic Temple Tifereth Israel, a Sephardic synagogue in Los Angeles, California

Maryland
 Congregation Tiferes Yisroel, an Orthodox synagogue in Baltimore, Maryland

New York
 Congregation Tifereth Israel (Brooklyn, New York) (the "Park Slope Jewish Center"), a Conservative synagogue in Park Slope, Brooklyn
 Congregation Tifereth Israel (Queens, New York) (the "Home Street Synagogue"), a synagogue in Corona; the oldest synagogue in Queens
 Congregation Tifereth Israel (Greenport, New York), a Liberal-Conservative synagogue in Greenport, Suffolk County
 Congregation Tifereth Yehuda Veyisroel, a historic synagogue in Kerhonkson, New York
 Congregation Kneses Tifereth Israel, a Conservative synagogue in Port Chester, New York

Ohio
The Temple Tifereth Israel (Cleveland, Ohio), a Reform congregation with a historic building in Cleveland and a second facility in suburban Beachwood, Ohio

Venezuela
 Tiféret Israel Synagogue, a synagogue in Caracas, Venezuela

Written works
 Tiferet Yisrael, a commentary on the Mishnah written by Israel Lipschitz